Rezvaniyeh may refer to:
 Rezvaniyeh, Fahraj, Kerman Province
 Rezvaniyeh Rural District, in Isfahan Province